Alpine skiing at the 1972 Winter Olympics consisted of six events, held February  near Sapporo, Japan. The downhills were held at Mount Eniwa, and the four technical events at Teine.

Medal summary
Six nations won medals in alpine skiing; Switzerland led in medals with three gold, two silver, and a bronze. Switzerland's Marie-Theres Nadig led the individual medal table, with two gold medals. The top men's medalist was Gustav Thöni of Italy with a gold and a silver.

The gold medal won in the slalom by Francisco Fernández Ochoa was Spain's first medal at the Winter Olympics. Through 2018, it remains its only gold medal at the Winter Games.

Medal table

Source:

Men's events

Source:

Women's events

Source:

Course information

Source:

Participating nations
Twenty-seven nations sent alpine skiers to compete in the events in Sapporo. The Philippines and Chinese Taipei made their Olympic alpine skiing debuts. Below is a list of the competing nations; in parentheses are the number of national competitors.

World championships
From 1948 through 1980, the alpine skiing events at the Winter Olympics also served as the World Championships, held every two years. With the addition of the giant slalom, the combined event was dropped for 1950 and 1952, but returned as a World Championship event in 1954 as a "paper race" which used the results from the three events. During the Olympics from 1956 through 1980, World Championship medals were awarded by the FIS for the combined event. The combined returned as a separate event at the World Championships in 1982 and at the Olympics in 1988.

Combined

Men's Combined

Downhill was run on 7 February, Giant Slalom on 9–10 February,Slalom on 13 February

Women's Combined

Downhill was run on 5 February, Giant Slalom on 8 February, Slalom on 11 February
Marie-Theres Nadig of Switzerland won the downhill and giant slalom, but DNF in first run of slalom.

References

External links
FIS-Ski.com – results – 1972 Winter Olympics – Sapporo, Japan
FIS-Ski.com – results – 1972 World Championships – Sapporo, Japan

 
1972 Winter Olympics events
Alpine skiing at the Winter Olympics
Winter Olympics
Alpine skiing competitions in Japan